Perry Wilkes (June 6, 1830 – March 19, 1889) was an American sailor who was awarded the Medal of Honor for actions during the American Civil War.

Biography 
Wilkes was born in Indiana on June 6, 1830. During the war, he served as the pilot aboard the USS Signal. He earned his medal on May 5, 1864, on the Red River, Louisiana. He died on March 19, 1889, and is buried in Cave Hill Cemetery, Louisville, Kentucky.

Medal of Honor citation

References

External links 
 Photos of his Grave site 
 Find A Grave

1830 births
1889 deaths
American Civil War recipients of the Medal of Honor
United States Navy Medal of Honor recipients
Burials at Cave Hill Cemetery